Besarion "Besa" Tsintsadze (born January 15, 1969) is a Georgian former competitive figure skater. He is the 1993 Karl Schäfer Memorial bronze medalist. He qualified to the final segment at three European Championships (1993, 1994, and 1995) and one World Championship (1994).

After retiring from competition, Tsintsadze performed with Disney on Ice and Ice Capades. He later became a skating coach, working with ice hockey players. After three years in New York, he moved to Pennsylvania in 2001. He married Julija Ļašenko, a former pair skater who won bronze at the 1988 World Junior Championships.

Competitive highlights

References 

1969 births
Male single skaters from Georgia (country)
Living people
Sportspeople from Tbilisi
Georgian emigrants to the United States